Events in the year 2012 in Slovakia.

Incumbents 
 President – Ivan Gašparovič 
 Prime Minister – Iveta Radičová, Robert Fico
 Speaker of the National Council – Pavol Hrušovský, Pavol Paška

Events
10 March – Slovak parliamentary election, 2012

Notable deaths

 11 January – Bohumil Golián, volleyball player (born 1931).
 16 August – Bystrík Režucha, conductor (born 1935)
 9 October – Elo Romančík, actor (born 1922)
 9 November – Milan Čič, lawyer and politician, Prime Minister of the Slovak Socialist Republic from 1989 to 1990 (born 1932).

References

 
2010s in Slovakia
Slovakia
Slovakia
Years of the 21st century in Slovakia